Itsuwa Dam  is a rockfill dam located in Kumamoto Prefecture in Japan. The dam is used for irrigation. The catchment area of the dam is 2.7 km2. The dam impounds about 5  ha of land when full and can store 570 thousand cubic meters of water. The construction of the dam was started on 1981 and completed in 1985.

See also
List of dams in Japan

References

Dams in Kumamoto Prefecture